The UNC Greensboro Spartans women's basketball team represents the University of North Carolina at Greensboro in NCAA Division I. The school's team currently competes in the Southern Conference.

History
They played in the NCAA Division III Tournament in 1982, 1983, 1984, 1985, 1986, 1987, and 1988. They made the Final Four in 1982 and 1988, losing to Elizabethtown College in the title game of the former and Concordia (Minnesota) in the Final Four in the latter.

They were champions of the Dixie Intercollegiate Athletic Conference (DIAC) in regular season and tournament in 1982, 1983, 1985, 1987, and 1988, with a tournament title also occurring in 1984 and a regular season title in 1986. They played in the Division II Tournament in 1991. They won the Big South Conference regular season title in five consecutive seasons from 1993 to 1997, but they failed to win the conference tournament, finishing as runner-up four times.

They won the Southern Conference conference tournament in 1998 after beating Georgia Southern 75-68. In their first ever NCAA Division I Tournament appearance, they lost 94-46 to Alabama in the First Round. They lost in the SoCon tournament championship game in 2000 (68-49 to Furman), 2001 (64-63 to Chattanooga), 2002 (77-69 to Chattanooga), and 2006 (91-79 to Chattanooga).

Postseason

NCAA Division I tournament results
The Spartans have made one appearance in the NCAA Division I women's basketball tournament. They have a combined record of 0–1.

NCAA Division II tournament results
The Spartans made one appearance in the NCAA Division II women's basketball tournament. They had a combined record of 0–1.

NCAA Division III tournament results
The Spartans made seven appearances in the NCAA Division III women's basketball tournament. They had a combined record of 9–6.

References

External links